Selby is a suburb of Johannesburg, South Africa. It is located in Region F of the City of Johannesburg Metropolitan Municipality.

History
Prior to the discovery of gold on the Witwatersrand in 1886, the suburb lay on land on one of the original farms called Turffontein. The area was originally mining land on which two mine's, Village Main and Ferreira Gold, were established. It was established as a suburb in 1928 and is named after mine manager Paul Selby of Ferreira Deep.

References

Johannesburg Region F